Ronald Yates is the name of:
Ronald John Yates (died 2012), former CEO of Qantas
Ronald W. Yates (born 1938), retired U.S. Air Force officer

See also
Ron Yeats (pronounced Yates, born 1937), Scottish footballer for Liverpool F.C.